Wilson Luiz Seneme (born 28 August 1970, in São Carlos) is a Brazilian football referee.

He became a FIFA referee in 2006. He was appointed in four games in 2011 FIFA U-20 World Cup. He managed the match between Paraguay and Uruguay in the start of 2014 FIFA World Cup - CONMEBOL qualifiers.

References

1970 births
Living people
Brazilian football referees